Tectaria zeilanica, the oak leaf fern, is a species of fern in the family Tectariaceae. It is native to Sri Lanka, India, and the Indochina region in southern China and Vietnam, and Taiwan.

It is a small fern, with erect fertile fronds, and sterile fronds shaped like small oak leaves.  
The name is often erroneously spelled 'zeylanica', but it was originally published as 'zeilanica', and this is not a correctable error under the International Code of Nomenclature for algae, fungi, and plants.

Synonym
 Quercifilix zeilanica

References

 Kew Bull. 27: 422 (1972)
 Barbara Joe Hoshizaki, Robbin Craig Moran, Fern grower's manual, 2nd edition, Timber Press, 2001, page 517. .
 V. S. Manickam, S. Harikrishanan, A. Bennianim and H. Joseph, "Rediscovery of Tectaria zeylanica (Houtt.) Sledge family: Dryopteridaecae: a rare species of Western Ghats, South India", Indian Fern Journal, Volume 20 No. 1-2 2003, pages 94–96.

zeilanica
Ferns of Asia
Ferns of India
Flora of China
Flora of Sri Lanka
Flora of Taiwan
Flora of Vietnam